José Irene Álvarez Ramos (born 26 January 1955) is a Mexican politician affiliated with the National Action Party. He served as Deputy of the LIX Legislature of the Mexican Congress as a plurinominal representative, and previously served in the LVI Legislature of the Congress of Sonora.

References

1955 births
Living people
People from Navojoa
Politicians from Sonora
Members of the Chamber of Deputies (Mexico)
National Action Party (Mexico) politicians
Members of the Congress of Sonora
21st-century Mexican politicians
National Autonomous University of Mexico alumni
Deputies of the LIX Legislature of Mexico